IPKO is a company that provides telecommunication services in Kosovo. It is the second mobile operator in the country. Amongst their services are: mobile telephony, fixed telephony, internet provider and cable TV. The main shareholder of the company is Telekom Slovenije.

Mobile telephony

Network coverage
IPKO Telecommunications company has built a network that covers 99.7% of the population of Kosovo and 98.5% of the territory. It started its operations in the mobile on December 14, 2007. 
Dialling codes for IPKO are: 043, 048 and 049 (internationally +383 43, +383 48 and +383 49). 
Identification code (IMSI) of IPKO is 221-02.

3G/4G and Wi-Fi
In December 2013, IPKO established a 3G network. 
Since deployment, IPKO has covered 80% of Kosovo’s population with 3G mobile internet, which equals to 43.7% of country’s territory.  IPKO’s 3G network coverage initially covered centers of the major cities and towns in Kosovo, while there was a plan for 2014 to expand its 3G network reach, in order to cover 75% of the territory and 88% of the population.
Ipko also offers 4G network across all Kosovo and offers free Wi-Fi access across its major cities.

TV services
Digital cable and IPTV is now offered in the majority of the cities in Kosovo: Pristina, Gjilan, Ferizaj, Prizren, Mitrovica, Gjakova, Vučitrn, Vitina, Deçan, Klina, Peja, Kaçanik, Kamenica, Podujevo and Istok.

Notes

References

External links 
 
 IPKO Portal

Telecommunications companies of Kosovo
Kosovo companies